Jazmin Pamela Shelley (born 13 May 2000) is an Australian college basketball player for the Nebraska Cornhuskers of the Big Ten Conference. A point guard, she began her college career at Oregon before transferring to Nebraska after her sophomore season. In her first year with the Cornhuskers, Shelley was a second-team All-Big Ten selection. She previously played for the Melbourne Boomers of the Women's National Basketball League, where she was named Rookie of the Year in 2019. Shelley plays for the Australian national team and is a three-time gold medalist at the junior level.

Early life and career
Shelley was born on 13 May 2000 to Phil and Carolyn Shelley, in Traralgon, Victoria. She grew up in Moe, Victoria, playing basketball, netball and soccer and competing in the high jump before deciding to focus on basketball. Shelley competed for her state team Victoria Country at the youth level and was named captain of the under-16 team in 2015. In her youth career, she also played for the Moe Meteors of the Country Basketball League, and the Southern Peninsula Sharks of the Big V. By 2016, she moved to Canberra to train full-time at the Australian Institute of Sport. In April 2017, Shelley led Victoria Country to its first under-18 national title since 2000, recording 13 points and five rebounds in the final. She attended Berwick Secondary College in Berwick, Victoria, and led its team to two Victorian College Championships in 2018, including one at the 3x3 tournament. 

On 16 March 2018, Shelley signed an amateur contract with the Melbourne Boomers of the Women's National Basketball League (WNBL) for the 2018–19 season. After helping the Boomers reach the semifinals, she was named WNBL Rookie of the Year. She received the Basketball Victoria Junior Female Athlete of the Year award for 2018. On 4 March 2019, Shelley signed with the Geelong Supercats of the NBL1 for the 2019 season. She averaged 10.5 points, 3.5 rebounds and 2.7 assists per game, helping her team achieve a runner-up finish.

Recruiting
Shelley was considered a three-star recruit and 28th-best point guard in the 2019 high school class by ESPN. She was encouraged to play college basketball in the United States because her brother, Luke, had enjoyed the experience. In October 2018, Shelley committed to Oregon over offers from Oregon State and Nebraska. She was drawn to Oregon by its facilities and culture, with many international players on the team, and felt that the program would prepare her for a professional career.

College career

Oregon
In her freshman season at Oregon, Shelley was a backup to Sabrina Ionescu and served as a three-point specialist. On 16 December 2019, she made her first career start with Satou Sabally not playing. During the game, Shelley scored a career-high 32 points and set a program single-game record with 10 three-pointers in an 84–41 win over UC Riverside. She helped Oregon win regular season and tournament championships in the Pac-12 Conference. Her team was among the favorites to win the 2020 NCAA tournament, which was canceled due to the COVID-19 pandemic. As a freshman, Shelley played in all 33 games, averaging 6.3 points, 1.5 assists and 1 rebound per game. She was selected to the Pac-12 All-Freshman honorable mention. In May 2020, she was named Basketball Victoria Junior Female Athlete of the Year for her second time. In her sophomore season, Shelley was expected to replace Ionescu as a starting point guard but struggled in her new role, playing fewer minutes despite starting in half of her appearances. On 1 January 2021, Shelley scored a season-high 13 points in a 92–69 victory over USC. As a sophomore, she averaged 4 points, 1.9 assists and 1.7 rebounds per game. After the season, Shelley entered the transfer portal. She made the decision because coaches and players with whom she had a close relationship had left the program.

Nebraska
On 13 April 2021, Shelley announced that she would transfer to Nebraska. She had also considered Iowa State and professional options in Australia. Shelley chose Nebraska because of her relationship with the coaching staff and to play alongside her longtime friend, Isabelle Bourne. She immediately assumed a leading role and made an all-around impact. On 20 November, she registered the fourth triple-double in program history, with 14 points, 10 rebounds and 10 assists in 20 minutes, helping her team defeat North Carolina Central, 113–58. In her next game on 26 November, Shelley scored 30 points and shot 8-of-9 from the field in a 65–53 win over Drexel. In the first round of the 2022 Big Ten tournament, she matched her career-high of 32 points and made a program-record nine three-pointers, tied for most in tournament history, in a 92–74 win over Illinois. Shelley averaged 13.1 points, 6.3 rebounds and 5 assists per game. She was named second-team All-Big Ten and was a media selection for the All-Defensive Team. She led her team in scoring, assists, steals and blocks.

National team career

Junior national team
Shelley represented Australia at the 2015 FIBA Under-16 Oceania Championship in New Zealand. She averaged 18.8 points, 3.3 steals and 3 assists per game, leading the tournament in each category, and helped her team win a gold medal. Shelley was named to the Australian team for the 2016 FIBA Oceania Under-18 Championship in Fiji. She averaged 13.8 points, 4 rebounds and 4 steals per game, winning another gold medal and being named to the all-tournament team. At the semifinals of the 2016 FIBA Under-17 World Championship in Spain, she scored 23 points to lead Australia to a 73–63 upset win over the United States, who had previously been undefeated in the tournament's four-year history. Shelley averaged 8.3 points, 3.8 rebounds and 3 assists per game, helping her team win the gold medal. She was a member of the bronze medal-winning Australian team at the 2018 FIBA Under-18 Asian Championship in India, averaging 8.8 points, 7 rebounds and 4.8 assists per game. Shelley averaged 8.6 points, 5.4 rebounds and 3.7 assists per game at the 2019 FIBA Under-19 World Cup in Thailand, where Australia won the silver medal.

Senior national team
Shelley earned her first selection to the Australian senior national team in July 2020, making the 23-player preliminary roster for the 2020 Summer Olympics. She was not named to the final roster. Shelley played for Australia at the 2021 FIBA Asia Cup in Jordan, where she averaged four points in under 13 minutes per game, as her team won the bronze medal.

Personal life
Shelley's parents, Phil and Carolyn, both played competitive basketball and her father became a shooting coach. She has two brothers, Luke and Austin, and one sister, Sam. Her brothers have both played college basketball: Luke at Kentucky Wesleyan and Austin at West Texas A&M. She is a sports media and communications major at the University of Nebraska–Lincoln.

References

External links
Nebraska Cornhuskers bio
Oregon Ducks bio

2000 births
Living people
Australian expatriate basketball people in the United States
Australian women's basketball players
Guards (basketball)
People from Moe, Victoria
Nebraska Cornhuskers women's basketball players
Oregon Ducks women's basketball players
Sportswomen from Victoria (Australia)